Jamie Burke (born October 15, 1980 in Cherry Point, North Carolina) is a former American rugby union player and now coach.

Life 
Jamie Burke began playing rugby in 1998 at the University of Virginia in Charlottesville, VA, where she went on to earn All-American Honors in 2000, 2001, 2002, and 2003.  In 2003, Burke won the prestigious Woodley Award, given to the top collegiate player in the country.

Following her graduation from UVA, she went on to play rugby for a number of clubs around the country; the Washington D.C. Furies; the Berkeley All-Blues, where she won a Division I National Championship in 2007,; Beantown RFC, where she won two National Championships with the NRU Senior Women All Stars in 2009 and 2010; Raleigh Venom, where Burke helped the team win the 2011 Division II National Championship.; and the Women's Premier League Glendale Raptors.

She made her debut for the USA National Team in 2004 against the New Zealand Black Ferns and has played in the 2006, 2010, and 2014 Women's Rugby World Cups.  She was one of the team captains at the 2010 Women's Rugby World Cup.

After the 2010 World Cup, Burke received several awards including IRB World Cup Dream Team, Team of the Year and Team of the Decade by Rugby Magazine, ScrumQueens All Star World Cup Team, and Team to Beat the World Champions by Letchworth. She was also named to the Team of the Year in 2011 by ScrumQueens.

In August 2013 Burke earned her 41st cap (sport) against England in the Nations Cup (Women's rugby), surpassing Eagle great, Patty Jervey, making her the most-capped women's player in the US. On August 13, 2014, during the 2014 Women's Rugby World Cup, Burke earned her 50th cap against Australia, making her the only woman in USA Rugby history to hit that milestone.

Jamie recently finished a graduate degree at the University of New Hampshire, where she has published several articles related to outdoor education. In 2010, Burke won the Thomas V. Moser, M.D. Memorial Scholarship, given in honor of Dr. Moser to outstanding rugby players pursuing educational goals that maximize their potential.

Since retiring from playing in 2014, Jamie has stepped into coaching.  She has served as the assistant coach for the Glendale Merlins' Women's Premier League team, helping guide the team to 2 National Championships.  She is also the head coach for the Rugby Colorado Girls High School All-State Team and has recently stepped into a role as an Assistant Coach with the USA Women's National Team.  In addition, she travels for USA Rugby as a coach educator.

Most recently, in 2020, Jamie was named as the best women's tighthead prop of all time.

References

External links
USA Women's National Team Profile
USA Rugby Archived Profile
UNH Media Relations

1980 births
Living people
United States women's international rugby union players
American female rugby union players
Female rugby union players
People from Cherry Point, North Carolina
21st-century American women